Castelnovo is the name of several comunes in Italy:

 Castelnovo Bariano, Province of Rovigo
 Castelnovo del Friuli, Province of Pordenone 
 Castelnovo di Sotto, Province of Reggio Emilia
 Castelnovo ne' Monti, Province of Reggio Emilia